TwinFocus Capital Partners LLC is a multi family office based in Boston, Massachusetts. The company was started in 2006 by twin brothers Paul and Wesley Karger. Today, TwinFocus has a 25-person team and represents more than 40 family office clients around the world with balance sheets totaling at least $100 million. The company manages an array of asset classes including stocks, bonds, mutual funds, private equity and real estate. As of September 2020, TwinFocus reported $7.5 billion in assets under advisory. Roughly 70 percent of the capital that the firm oversees is for U.S.-based families.

In October 2018, TwinFocus opened its London office in Mayfair, an affluent area in the city's West End. In early 2019, TwinFocus helped its founding European client, Markerstudy Group, facilitate the £185 million acquisition of Co-op Insurance. Shortly thereafter, the firm introduced formal M&A and real estate advisory services for its global ultra-high net worth client base.

TwinFocus is also present in Latin America and Asia, working with entrepreneurs with substantial cash holdings. The company's main competitors in Asia include Morgan Stanley, Merrill Lynch, and Goldman Sachs.

References

Companies based in Boston
Financial services companies based in Massachusetts
2006 establishments in Massachusetts
Financial services companies established in 2006